Mugineic-acid 3-dioxygenase (IDS2) is an enzyme with systematic name mugineic acid,2-oxoglutarate:oxygen oxidoreductase (3-hydroxylating). This enzyme catalyses the following chemical reaction

 (1) mugineic acid + 2-oxoglutarate + O2  3-epihydroxymugineic acid + succinate + CO2
 (2) 2'-deoxymugineic acid + 2-oxoglutarate + O2  3-epihydroxy-2'-deoxymugineic acid + succinate + CO2

Mugineic-acid 3-dioxygenase contains iron(II).
Mugineic acid is an amino acid excreted by some graminaceous (grassy) plants under conditions of iron deficiency as part of a strategy of solubilizing Fe from the root environment for uptake by the plant. Mugineic acid is closely related to its biochemical precursor, nicotianamine, and to a number of other compounds that also have been identified as phytosiderophores in graminaceous plants: 3-hydroxymugineic acid, 2'-deoxymugineic acid, avenic acid, and distichonic acid.
The effectiveness of mugineic acid under iron-deficient conditions is dependent not only upon the iron chelating properties of the Fe-mugineic acid complex itself but also upon the presence of a plant membrane carrier that recognizes and absorbs the Fe-mugineic acid complex almost exclusively.

References

External links 

EC 1.14.11